Trinity is a 2003 British science fiction film written and directed by Gary Boulton-Brown. It stars Tom McCamus as Dr. Clerval, Lucy Akhurst as Schiller, and Stephen Moyer as Brach.

Premise
In a remote Arctic research station, government agents Brach and Schiller discover the mysterious genetic scientist Dr. Clerval. A psychological chess game ensues. It turns out that Schiller was a subject in one of Clerval's genetic breeding programs, and was co-dependent of him. Brach once was Clerval's henchman. He feels torn between his love for Schiller and his unadmitted, deep loyalty towards Clerval.

Production
Filming took place at Bushey Campus, Hertfordshire, North London.

Release
The film was shown on 3 March 2003 at the Cinequest Film & Creativity Festival and 7 April 2003 at the Philadelphia International Film Festival.

References

External links
 
 http://www.masonesque.net/html/trinity.html
 https://www.webcitation.org/query?url=http://www.geocities.com/yank_racek/trinity&date=2009-10-26+00:24:38

2003 films
2003 science fiction films
British science fiction films
Films scored by Ilan Eshkeri
Films set in the Arctic
Films shot in Hertfordshire
Mad scientist films
2000s English-language films
2000s British films